Jimmy Collins (born 1923) was an Irish goalkeeper during the 1940s and 1950s.

Collins played for Bohemians and Shamrock Rovers during his career in the League of Ireland and was goalkeeper in the 1945 Bohemian Inter City Cup winning team against Belfast Celtic at Dalymount Park.

He earned three League of Ireland XI caps while at Milltown in the 1940s. Played for St Patrick's Athletic in the 1950s.

His uncle Frank Collins played for Celtic and his brother Paddy also played for Pats. His brother-in-law was St Patrick's Athletic stalwart Harry Boland.

Honours

FAI Cup
  Shamrock Rovers - 1948
Inter City Cup: 3
  Bohemians - 1945
  Shamrock Rovers - 1946, 1947
Dublin City Cup
  Shamrock Rovers - 1947/48

Sources 
 The Hoops by Paul Doolan and Robert Goggins

Republic of Ireland association footballers
League of Ireland players
Bohemian F.C. players
Shamrock Rovers F.C. players
St Patrick's Athletic F.C. players
Association football goalkeepers
Possibly living people
1923 births
Association footballers from Dublin (city)
League of Ireland XI players